Judge Alex is an American arbitration-based reality court show that was presided over by retired police officer, lawyer, and Florida Judge Alex Ferrer. The series premiered on September 12, 2005, 4 months after Texas Justice concluded. The series ended on May 21, 2014. The show aired in syndication.

On January 17, 2014, it was announced that Judge Alex had ceased production. The final episode aired on May 21, 2014, With reruns continuing until August of that year.

As the child of Cuban immigrants, Ferrer is fully bilingual.

Judge Alex Ferrer

While Ferrer handled cases that ranged from armed robberies to kidnappings and first-degree murders as a Florida circuit court judge, his cases on Judge Alex have been described as far tamer, entertaining, and by the arbiter himself as often "bizarre." Every three weeks, he taped ten cases a day over three days previously in Houston where the show was based (In the 2010-2011 season the show moved to Sunset Bronson Studios in Los Angeles); he then flew back home to Miami, where he lives with his wife and two children.

Personable and sensible with a sense of humor, Ferrer was not overly harsh or given to mouthing off like some of his judicial counterparts, though he did keep a firm control over his courtroom and did not allow misconduct or disrespect. Ferrer's rulings were often prefaced by his explanation of the law at hand to his audience.

References

External links
 
American comedy television series
2000s American legal television series
2010s American legal television series
2005 American television series debuts
2014 American television series endings
First-run syndicated television programs in the United States
Television shows filmed in Los Angeles
Television series by 20th Century Fox Television
English-language television shows
Arbitration courts and tribunals
Court shows